Imphal East district (Meitei pronunciation: /ˈɪmfəl or ɪmˈfɑːl/) is one of the 16 districts of Manipur state in northeastern India. As of 2011, it is the second most populous district in the state, after Imphal West.

History

This district came into existence on 18 June 1997.

Imphal East District came into existence on  18-06-1997 with its headquarters at Porompat occupying the eastern part of Imphal District. The total area of District is 497 km2. approximately. The District is situated at an altitude 790 metres above the M.S. Level. The climate of the District is salubrious and Monsoon is tropical. The minimum temperature goes down to 0.6 degree Celsius in winter and 41 degree Celsius in summer. It has no rail network and hence communication is entirely dependent on roads except Jiribam District bordering Cachar District of Assam where there is a railhead. As of 2017, A new rail line is under construction and a railway station will be operational by 2019.  The District is connected with N.H. 39, N.H. 53 and N.H. 150.

Demographics

Population 

According to the 2011 census Imphal East district has a population of 456,113, roughly equal to the nation of Malta. This gives it a ranking of 551st in India (out of a total of 640). Its population growth rate over the decade 2001-2011 was  14.63%. Imphal East has a sex ratio of 1011 females for every 1000 males, and a literacy rate of 82.81%. After bifurcation, the district has population 412,275. Scheduled Castes and Scheduled Tribes make up 2.04% and 5.38% of the population respectively.

Languages 

As per 2011 census, the languages spoken in Imphal East District (excluding newly created Jiribam district) are Manipuri (3,75,207), Nepali (6,851), Rongmei (6,622), Tangkhul (4,205), and Kuki (2,066).

Administrative divisions

Recently, Jiribam District is carved out from Imphal East district comprising sub-divisions of Jiribam, Borobekra, and Babukhal.

Areas under Imphal Urban Agglomeration
 Porompat

Economy

Agriculture
Agriculture is the main occupation of the people in the district. In the district there are 27,000 and 4,100 hectares of land for H.Y.V. (high yield variety) and improved local paddy field respectively. There are land of 450 hectares for maize, 60 hectares for wheat and 350 hectares for potato in the district. The main food crops are paddy, potato and vegetables. Among the cash crops are sugar cane, maize, pulse, oil seed and other vegetables etc. The total number of workers engaged in agriculture in the district was 42,473 as per 1991 census of which 28,661 were male and 13,812 were female. Spices like chilli, onion, ginger, turmeric and coriander of very good quality are grown in the district.

Horticulture

Horticulture products have been acquiring popularity with the people in the district. Fruits like pineapple, banana, lemon and papaya grow well in the district. Pineapple grows in plenty at the slope of Ngariyan Hill. There is considerable scope for increasing the area under different horticulture crops. The soil and climate favour for mass plantation of horticulture products in the district.

The following is the areas and production of horticulture crops in the district during 1998-99

Livestock

In the district, there is a dairy farm and a veterinary training center. There are also 5 veterinary Hospitals and 19 Veterinary Dispensaries in the district along with 3 nos. of Aids centers. The following is the population of livestock as per survey report of 1997 census.

Forest
The following is the information of forest products available in the district

Tourism

There are two motels in the district, one is at Kaina and another at Jiribam. Shree-Shree Govindajee Temple, a golden temple located in the palace compound is still here. There are two war cemeteries maintained by the British war grave commission. In addition to this there is a temple at Kaina a holy place of the Hindu. Besides, Hanuman Temple at Mahabali is a pre-historical place in the State. Manipur is known for its scenic environment, landscapes, climate and cultural heritage which has a great potential for development of tourism.

Geography
Porompat town is the administrative headquarters of the district. Nandeibam is also in the district.

Climate

See also
List of populated places in Imphal East district
Huikap
Keikhoo
 Three Mothers Art Gallery

References

External links
 Imphal East district website

 

 
Districts of Manipur
1997 establishments in Manipur